Pangang Group Vanadium Titanium & Resources Co., Ltd., parented by Panzhihua Iron and Steel, involves in the manufacture and sales of iron, steel and vanadium products. It is headquartered in Panzhihua, Sichuan, China.

It was established in 1993 with the name of Pangang Group Steel Plate Company Limited. It was listed on the Shenzhen Stock Exchange in 1996. Its name was changed to Panzhihua New Steel & Vanadium Company Limited in 1998 and changed its name to Pangang Group Vanadium Titanium and Resources Co., Ltd. in August 2013.

References

Further reading 
Vanadium What is vanadium and why is it so important?

External links
pzhsteel.com.cn/pgvt/

Chinese companies established in 1993
Companies based in Sichuan
Steel companies of China
Government-owned companies of China
Companies listed on the Shenzhen Stock Exchange
1993 establishments in China